Conan O'Brien Needs a Friend is a weekly podcast hosted by American comedian and former talk show host Conan O'Brien. It is co-hosted by O'Brien's assistant, Sona Movsesian, and producer, Matt Gourley.  The podcast debuted in November 2018 and features O'Brien talking with comedians and actors in the industry, including Danhausen, Jeff Goldblum, Adam Sandler, Stephen Colbert, David Letterman, Will Ferrell, Kristen Bell, Bill Burr, Tom Hanks, and Tina Fey; along with personal friends, such as Lisa Kudrow and Timothy Olyphant; as well as people he admires, such as Barack Obama and Michelle Obama, Neil Young, and Robert Caro. 

Conan O'Brien Needs a Friend has received positive reviews from critics and is one of the top podcasts on iTunes.

History
Conan O'Brien Needs a Friend premiered November 18, 2018, when O'Brien's talk show was on hiatus and being retooled from an hour-long format into a half-hour format.  O'Brien announced, "After 25 years of extensive market research, we have learned that people want to hear my voice without seeing my face. So rejoice, America." The title refers to the podcast's premise that O'Brien is only friends with people who work for him, and the friendly conversations he has with celebrities on his talk show rarely translate to lasting friendships, an issue he is looking to fix.

The first 36 episodes of the podcast were packaged together as one season. A second season consisting of another 36 episodes premiered on October 7, 2019, after a run of six special episodes titled Deep Dive with Dana Carvey. A third season premiered on August 3, 2020.

In April 2021, O'Brien launched a companion podcast titled Conan O'Brien Needs A Fan, in which he, Movsesian, and Gourley will take questions from fans via Zoom.

In July 2021, it was announced that David Hopping would replace Movsesian during her maternity leave. Movsesian returned on the episode released October 10, 2021, the same podcast where Gourley announced he would be taking a month-long paternity leave.

In November 2021, O'Brien, Movsesian, and Gourley performed a live version of the podcast at the Wiltern Theater in Los Angeles.

In May 2022, the podcast, as well as the entire digital media business Team Coco, was sold to SiriusXM for $150 million. The show was announced to continue to be distributed everywhere it had previously been available.

Format

The podcast episodes opens with the guests stating their names and saying, "I feel _ about being Conan O'Brien's friend" in which they state their feelings about their respective friendships with Conan, intercut with guitar music by Jimmy Vivino. This is followed by the show's theme music, "We're Going to Be Friends"  by The White Stripes. The majority of the podcast is then a casual interview between O'Brien and the guest.

Sona Movsesian, O'Brien's long-time personal assistant, and Matt Gourley, the podcast's producer, serve as sidekicks. Many of the episodes feature O'Brien periodically reading ads, sometimes introduced as a segment called "Conan O'Brien Pays Off the Mortgage on His Beach House". To close out the podcast, conversations largely unrelated to the preceding interview are featured, with O'Brien, Movsesian, and Gourley discussing topics including minor workplace squabbles, the success of the podcast, O'Brien's idiosyncrasies, or listeners' messages.

Reception

Critical reception
Conan O'Brien Needs a Friend has received strong reviews. Writing for Rolling Stone, Matt Saincome listed it among the best new podcasts of 2018: "Instead of the heavily choreographed late-night talk show conversations, listeners are treated to a much more vulnerable, behind the scenes vibe from O'Brien. The dynamic between him and his assistant Sona Movsesian helps with this. The relationship is endearing and serves as a springboard for the listener to get to know Conan better, by hearing how those around him see him." Saincome listed the podcasts with Kristen Bell and Dax Shepard as highlights among the first few episodes, writing, "All episodes of this podcast are worth a listen so far, but the one-two punch of Kristen Bell and Dax Shepard stood out for the genuine warmth and discussion of Conan's personal life."

In his review for Vulture, Nicholas Quah praised O'Brien as a stellar podcast host in a very crowded field, writing, "His weirdness translates well to the casual intimacy that's come to define the podcast as a platform for performance, and his default stance of efficient self-deprecation makes the show feel accessible in ways that other comedy podcasts, fronted by needier ids, may not." Quah also praised the dynamic among O'Brien and his sidekicks on the show, Sona Movsesian and Matt Gourley: "It also helps that O'Brien is great at the performance of longer-form interviews, effectively balancing the impulse of filling the room with being genuinely curious, and there's also a lot of charm to be found in the podcast, particularly in the core O'Brien-Movsesian-Gourley workplace dynamic, which goes a long way to providing listeners with a sheen of habitual comfort."

In an article for The Boston Globe, Joshua Macht noted that O'Brien establishing a weekly podcast confirmed that podcasting is no longer on the fringes of the digital audio market. Macht writes, "The arrival of heavy hitters such as Conan O'Brien may not signal the end of podcasting—or even the peak—but it will usher in a new phase for the medium."

In a review for BBC Radio 4's Podcast Radio Hour, Jake Yapp celebrated the "sincerity and openness" of the show, despite its strong humor content. Yapp also praised the parity between guest and host, despite the many outstanding comedians on the podcast, and noted that there was a sincere lack of one-upmanship common among comedians.

According to Irish writer Mark Farrelly, who called the podcast an "auditory delight", the podcast has been developing a "cult following" in Europe. Farrelly also praised the unexpected humor in the "Conan O'Brien Pays Off the Mortgage on His Beach House" segments, with O'Brien "showing his genius by turning live reads into top notch comedy material."

O'Brien's success as a podcast host was the cover story of the August 20, 2019, issue of Variety magazine, in which he was dubbed "the darling of the podcasting world." That day, Marc Maron appeared on Conan with the issue, jokingly taking offense that O'Brien had been dubbed a pioneer of the medium after approximately 30 episodes, whereas Maron had done more than 1,000 at that point.

The show won the 2021 Ambies Award for "Best Comedy Podcast".

Downloads
Matt Gourley stated in the May 12, 2019, episode featuring Bill Hader, that each episode receives one million downloads in its first cycle, shortly after release, which Variety referred to as "blockbuster numbers for a podcast." In August 2021, Deadline Hollywood reported the podcast had reached over 250 million downloads and averaged more than 9 million downloads per month.

Episodes

Series overview

Season 1 (2018–19)

Deep Dive with Dana Carvey (2019)

Season 2 (2019–2020)
Episodes 37, 38, and 39 were rereleases of the Jeff Goldblum, Michelle Obama, and Bob Newhart episodes respectively.

Summer S'mores season 1 (& Tom Hanks) (2020)

(2020–present)

After Season 1 and Season 2, the show abandoned the concept of seasons for podcasts.

Conan O'Brien Needs a Fan (2021–present)

Summer S'mores season 2 (2022)

References

External links
 

2018 podcast debuts
Audio podcasts
Comedy and humor podcasts
Conan O'Brien
Interview podcasts
Earwolf